Máyyan 'Ooyákma – Coyote Ridge Open Space Preserve is an 1,831-acre (7.41 km2) publicly owned park in southern Santa Clara County. It is currently undergoing restoration and infrastructure work and is scheduled to open to the public in 2023.

Environment 
Because of its rare serpentine soil, this grassland area is a critical habitat for the Bay checkerspot butterfly, the California tiger salamander, and the California red-legged frog, all of which are endangered. It also supports a wide variety of California native and endemic plants.

Acquisition 
Ins 2015 the Santa Clara Valley Open Space Authority acquired 1,831 acres (7.41 km2) in the area previously referred to by various names, including Coyote Ridge.  On 27 October 2022 its name was modified to  "Máyyan 'Ooyákma – Coyote Ridge Open Space Preserve" to include the Chochenyo translation of "coyote ridge" as well as the English.

A variety of public and private sources made the acquisition possible after United Technologies Corporation (UTC) agreed to donate the property to the Open Space Authority. UTC receives a tax credit through the California Natural Heritage State Tax Credit Program.
Under this program, the Open Space Authority must reimburse the state.
The Authority received funding for the acquisition from a broad public and private partnership that
included a $2.7 million grant from the Wildlife Conservation Board, $2 million from the U.S. Fish and
Wildlife Service Section 6 land acquisition program to further Habitat Conservation Plans under the
Endangered Species Act, $1 million from the Gordon and Betty Moore Foundation, $1 million from the
State Coastal Conservancy, $1 million from the Bureau of Reclamation Central Valley Project, $400,000
from the State Parks Recreational Trails Program, and a contributor who prefers to remain anonymous.
The Open Space Authority contributed $7,500 toward the $8.6 million total, which is approximately 55% of the property’s fair market value of $15.6 million

References

Parks in Santa Clara County, California